Clelia langeri is a species of snake in the family Colubridae. The species is endemic to Bolivia.

References

Mussuranas
Clelia
Snakes of South America
Reptiles of Bolivia
Endemic fauna of Bolivia
Reptiles described in 2005